Aiphanes grandis is a species of flowering plant in the family Arecaceae. It is found only in Ecuador. Its natural habitats are subtropical or tropical moist lowland forests and subtropical or tropical moist montane forests. It is threatened by habitat loss.

References

grandis
Endemic flora of Ecuador
Endangered plants
Taxonomy articles created by Polbot